Roche Bonhomme is a  mountain summit located in Jasper National Park in Alberta, Canada. It is located in the Colin Range, which is a sub-range of the Canadian Rockies. Its nearest higher peak is Grisette Mountain,  to the east.

Roche Bonhomme was named in 1878 by George Munro Grant for the fact it has an anthropomorphic shape.
The French "Roche Bonhomme" translates to "Rock Fellow." The mountain's name was officially adopted in 1947 by the Geographical Names Board of Canada. Roche Bonhomme is composed of Permian and Carboniferous strata topped by darker Triassic siltstone of the Sulphur Mountain Formation.


Climate

Based on the Köppen climate classification, Roche Bonhomme is located in a subarctic climate with cold, snowy winters, and mild summers. Temperatures can drop below -20 °C with wind chill factors below -30 °C. In terms of favorable weather, June through September are the best months to climb. Precipitation runoff from Roche Bonhomme flows into tributaries of the Maligne River which in turn is a tributary of the Athabasca River.

See also
 Geography of Alberta
 Geology of the Rocky Mountains

References

External links
 Parks Canada web site: Jasper National Park

Two-thousanders of Alberta
Canadian Rockies
Mountains of Jasper National Park